Ken Krolicki (born March 15, 1996) is a Japanese-American footballer who plays for NPL Victoria side Bentleigh Greens.

Personal life
Krolicki was born in Tokyo, Japan, to a Polish-American father and a Japanese mother and holds both Japanese and American passports. Krolicki moved to Fukuoka Prefecture as a young child, and grew up in Kitakyushu, Japan and moved to Michigan as a freshman in high school. He majored in applied engineering sciences at Michigan State.

Career

College and amateur
Krolicki played his college career at Michigan State University where he played mainly as a midfielder. Krolicki played 81 matches for the Spartans, starting 67. He scored 7 goals and had 14 assists. At Michigan State, Krolicki was named first-team All-Big Ten and first-team All-Midwest Region and was an All-Academic Big Ten selection.

Krolicki also played for Premier Development League side K-W United. He was a member of the 2015 K-W United team that won the PDL championship against the New York Red Bulls U-23 side.

Before college, Krolicki played for the U-16 and U-18 Crew Academy Wolves in 2013 and 2014 in Michigan. He was also a member of the 2011 Canton High School team that won the Michigan state championship and the 2012 Michigan Jaguars club team that won the US Youth Soccer U-16 National Championship.

Professional
On January 21, 2018, Montreal Impact selected Krolicki with the 53rd overall pick of the 2018 MLS SuperDraft. He signed with the club on February 28, 2018.

Krolicki made his professional debut on March 4, 2018, when he started in a 2–1 loss against Vancouver Whitecaps FC.

On November 21, 2019, Krolicki's contract option was declined by Montreal.

Krolicki made the move to USL Championship side Portland Timbers 2 on January 15, 2020. Timbers 2 opted to stop operating following the 2020 season.

Honours

Club

Montreal Impact
 Canadian Championship: 2019

Career statistics

References

Living people
1996 births
People from Fukuoka
Japanese footballers
Japanese people of American descent
Japanese people of Polish descent
Japanese emigrants to the United States
American soccer players
American sportspeople of Japanese descent
American people of Polish descent
Association football midfielders
CF Montréal players
Michigan State Spartans men's soccer players
K-W United FC players
CF Montréal draft picks
USL League Two players
Major League Soccer players
Soccer players from Michigan
Japanese expatriate footballers
Japanese expatriate sportspeople in Canada
Expatriate soccer players in Canada
Portland Timbers 2 players
Japanese expatriate sportspeople in Australia
American expatriate sportspeople in Australia
Expatriate soccer players in Australia